Early general elections were held in Sweden between 10 and 26 September 1921. In the first elections held under universal suffrage, the Swedish Social Democratic Party remained the largest party, winning 93 of the 230 seats in the Second Chamber of the Riksdag. Party leader Hjalmar Branting formed his second government.

Background
Before the elections in 1921, the Social Democratic Left Party of Sweden accepted Lenin's April Theses. It was renamed the Communist Party of Sweden, whilst a breakaway faction of some 6,000 socialists who had been excluded by the communists as non-revolutionary elements kept the previous name.

Electoral system

In 1921, universal and equal suffrage was introduced for men and women alike, and the Riksdag finally achieved a system of democratic representation for all citizens who were at least 23 years old on election day. Nevertheless, it was still possible, even after 1921, to exclude certain groups from the right to vote. An example was individuals who had been declared incapable of managing their own affairs by a court of law. This limitation of the franchise disappeared only in 1989 when the Riksdag abolished incapacitation.

It signified the five first women MPs to be elected to the Swedish Parliament after the women suffrage of 1919, with Kerstin Hesselgren in the Upper chamber, and Nelly Thüring (Social Democrat), Agda Östlund (Social Democrat) Elisabeth Tamm (liberal) and Bertha Wellin (Conservative) in the Lower chamber.

Alongside the universal franchise reform, a parliamentary system of government developed and gained acceptance, implying that the government requires the Riksdag's confidence and support for all major decisions. As of 1921, all major treaties with foreign states had to be approved by the Riksdag, and the two chambers of the Riksdag now elected their own Speakers along with two deputy speakers each.

Results

Aftermath
As a result of the election Prime Minister Oscar von Sydow resigned and was replaced by Hjalmar Branting who also became Foreign Minister of Sweden. Although the non-socialist parties held a majority in the second chamber, Branting was able to hold office through being the largest party and reaching cross-ideological consensus in the chamber. The centre-right majority took over the governing in 1923 under Ernst Trygger following a parliamentary loss for the Social Democrats over unemployment protection.

Notes

References

Nordisk familjebok, (Owl edition), 2nd ed., Stockholm : Nordisk familjeboks förlags aktiebolag, 1904-1926 

General elections in Sweden
Sweden
General
Sweden